City of Lies is a 2018 crime film directed by Brad Furman.

City of Lies may also refer to:

 City of Lies (book), 2014 nonfiction book by Ramita Navai
 City of Lies (novel), 2018 young adult novel by Sam Hawke

Disambiguation pages